The 2014 FIBA Basketball World Cup included teams with rosters of 12 players each; a team may opt to have one naturalized player from its roster. The rosters were finalized at the team managers' meeting, at the night prior to the first game.

Player ages are as of 30 August 2014, the first day of the tournament.

Group A

Brazil
Brazil announced 10 of its final 12-man squad on 18 June 2014. The remaining two members were drawn from the Brazil team that competed at the 2014 FIBA South American Championship in Venezuela in late July. A 14-player roster was named on 6 August. The 12-player squad was revealed on 13 August 2014.

Egypt
A 16-player preliminary roster was named on 29 July. On 14 August 2014 the roster was cut down to 14. On 22 August the 12-player roster was announced.

France
France initially announced a 24-man preliminary roster, and announced seven cuts on 13 June 2014. On 21 July, one of the players on the 17-man roster, Alexis Ajinça, announced that he would not play in the World Cup because his wife was expected to give birth during the tournament. Three days later, Kevin Séraphin announced that his NBA team, the Washington Wizards, would not release him for the World Cup because he was recovering from a knee surgery; Séraphin was replaced on the training roster by Ian Mahinmi. The roster was trimmed down to 14 on 10 August 2014 and to 13 a day later. On 12 August 2014 the 12-player roster was announced. Nando de Colo was ruled out of the world cup due to a fractured hand on 17 August 2014. Charles Lombahe-Kahudi was named as the replacement on 19 August 2014. Kim Tillie replaced Ian Mahinmi, who was ruled out due to a left shoulder injury.

Iran
Iran announced an initial 15-man training roster on 26 July 2014 and cut the roster to 13 on 9 August 2014.
The final roster was announced on 27 August 2014.

Serbia

On 23 July 2014, coach Aleksandar Đorđević announced a preliminary squad for the World Cup. Due to injury Vladimir Lučić, Vasilije Micić, Ognjen Kuzmić and Nemanja Dangubić canceled their participation at the end of July. On 19 August 2014 Nemanja Nedović was ruled out due to a foot injury. On 24 August 2014, Vladimir Micov left the national team, before the final roster was published two days later.

Spain
Spain announced its final 12-man roster on 1 July 2014.

Group B

Argentina
Argentina announced nine of its final 12-man roster in June 2014. However, three of the initially named players were ruled out of the competition. First, on 7 July, Juan Pedro Gutiérrez was ruled out of the World Cup due to an injury. By the end of the month, Carlos Delfino was ruled out due to a foot injury that had caused him to miss the entire  with the Milwaukee Bucks and the San Antonio Spurs notified Manu Ginóbili, who was recovering from a stress fracture, that they would not release him for the World Cup.

The remaining members came from the squad that played at the 2014 FIBA South American Championship in Venezuela in late July. A 14-player squad was released on 7 August 2014.

The final roster was announced on 12 August 2014.

Croatia
Croatia announced its initial 24-man training roster on 26 June 2014, and cut the roster to 17 on 10 July. The roster was down to 15 on 7 August 2014. Croatia announced its final roster on 23 August 2014.

Greece
Greece announced a 16-man preliminary roster on 14 July 2014. On 22 July, the agent for Kosta Koufos notified Greece coach Fotis Katsikaris that Koufos would not play in the World Cup; Katsikaris announced Andreas Glyniadakis as a replacement. The 12-player roster was announced on 23 August 2014.

Philippines
A 16-man squad was announced on 28 February 2014. On 18 August 2014 the final 12-man roster was announced.

Puerto Rico
A 15-player roster was announced on 9 August 2014. The final roster was published on 19 August 2014.

Senegal
Senegal announced a 22-man preliminary roster on 7 July 2014. The squad was cut to 16 on 5 August. The 12-player roster was announced on 23 August 2014.

Group C

Dominican Republic
A 14-player squad was announced on 10 August 2014. The final 12-player roster was published on 26 August 2014.

Finland
Finland announced its final roster on 20 August 2014.

New Zealand
New Zealand announced its preliminary 24-man roster on 26 June 2014. Seven cuts were announced on 11 July. They named their final 12-man roster on 20 August.

Turkey
Turkey announced a 17-man training camp roster on 14 July 2014. Four other players, who were not at the training camp, were on the preliminary roster. Two were excused from camp, one was recovering from a minor surgery and one was on duty with the Turkey under-20 national team. By 14 August 2014, the roster was trimmed to 14. On 24 August 2014 the final roster was announced.

Ukraine
The roster was announced on 27 August 2014.

United States

Group D

Angola
The 12-player roster was announced on 25 August 2014.

Australia
Basketball Australia announced its final World Cup roster on 28 July 2014.

South Korea
The 12-man roster was announced on 1 August 2014.

Lithuania
Lithuania head coach Jonas Kazlauskas announced a 17-man preliminary roster on 1 July 2014. The final 12-man squad was announced on 26 August 2014. After Mantas Kalnietis suffered a clavicular dislocation, Adas Juškevičius joined the final roster as a replacement.

Mexico

Slovenia
A preliminary roster was published on 15 July 2014.

Players per national domestic league
* country did not qualify

References

External links 

FIBA World Championship Homepage
FIBA World Championship Team List

Squads
FIBA Basketball World Cup squads